Clayton Brook is a large residential estate in Lancashire, between the city of Preston and the town of Chorley. It forms part of the Clayton-le-Woods civil parish, and is in the Clayton-le-Woods North ward of the borough of Chorley. Lying next to the industrial estate of Walton Summit, one-time terminus of a branch of the Lancaster Canal, it also neighbours Clayton Green, Hoghton and Brindle, and is not far from the small town of Bamber Bridge. Clayton Brook Village as it is often termed, is bounded by the A6 road and the M61 and M65 motorways, and is conveniently near the M6 motorway.

History

The highest land point of the Clayton Brook estate found in the playing fields between Woodfield, Croft Meadow and Carr Barn Brow is the previous summit site of the now defunct Walton Summit stretch of the Lancaster Canal. The canal summit was once linked to the Preston terminus of the said canal via the Lancaster Canal Tramroad. The demise of this stretch was brought on by the onset of the M61 that now runs alongside Clayton Brook at its eastern edge.

Reminders of the area's navigable past remain however, with the nearby Tramway Lane linking the estate to junction 2 of the M65 and 9 of the M61. Bridge 10 of the canal stretch also remains, albeit ruined and amongst overgrowth, It ran up behind Woodfield where skate board hill is now, that was the tramway with the terminus at the top near Carr Barn Brow where now stand Briary Court, in nearby farmland across the motorway from the summit.

The whole area was once owned by Hoghton Tower, which was a major landowner in the Chorley and South Ribble areas.

Clayton Brook was built in the late 1970s and early 1980s by the Central Lancashire New Town Development Corporation, which also developed the Walton Summit industrial estate nearby. It was affected by the recession in the late 1980s to early 1990s.

May 2013 was when the Clayton Brook pub started to be knocked down. Also in 2013 Clayton Brook/Community House won Community Futures for being the best self developed community out of 39 organisations in the Central Lancashire area.

Transport
Clayton Brook is served by two bus routes: the frequent 125 service operated by Stagecoach between Preston and Bolton and the 114 service between Leyland and Chorley.

Housing
There is a good mix of residential properties.  Approximately half the 4,000 plus properties are rented, with the landlord now being the housing association group Places for People. Clayton Brook was originally built in the late 1970s and early 1980s.

Amenities
It hosts several primary schools, including Clayton Brook Primary School, Westwood Primary School and St Bede's Primary School. Although Westwood Primary School and St Bede's actually fall under Clayton-le-Woods.

There are three churches in the parish of Clayton Brook, one being Clayton Brook Community Church across from the village centre. The other being St Bede's and St John the Evangelist in Whittle-le-Woods, The village centre is only 10 minutes walk from the large Asda supermarket in Clayton Green. The local wildlife preserve is Cuerden Valley Park (the grounds of Cuerden Hall) - and there are several public footpaths within the vicinity taking walkers to a variety of green destinations.

It also hosts the 1st Clayton Brook Scouts, Cubs, Beavers all in the Clayton Brook Village Hall.

References

External links

 Places for People, Chorley Borough Council

Villages in Lancashire
Geography of Chorley